Olivier Dion (born August 10, 1991) is a Canadian singer who specializes in pop music.

Career
In 2008, Dion, along with Daniel Hamlitsch and Matthew Gaiser, formed the indie rock group Late Young. They released one EP entitled Nativity, of which Dion contributed his vocals alongside the bass guitar.

Dion first came to attention on the reality TV series Star Académie, competing for the title of the best singer. Despite not winning the competition, Dion participated in the Star Académie tour, which had over 130,000 spectators. His song, "Pour exister" on the album, Star Académie 2012 reached double platinum, becoming a hit on Quebec radios.

In the summer of 2013, Dion played Link Larkin in the musical, Hairspray, which was directed by Denise Filiatrault.

On 1 December 2014, Columbia France announced that Dion had signed a licensed contract with the company to develop his European career, and released his single, "Si j'étais son soleil" on European radio the same day.

On the 18th, 19th and 20 February 2015, Dion performed an opening act of Véronic DiCaire at the Olympia music hall in Paris, France. On 11 June 2015 he was selected to interpret the role of d'Artagnan in the musical, Les Trois Mousquetaires at the Palais des Sports in Paris on September 29, 2016, and continue to tour around France until January 2017.

On June 16, 2015, the music video for "Je t'aime c'est tout", the first single from the musical Les Trois Mousquetaires was launched.

Dion competed in the sixth season of the French show Danse avec les stars. He finished in third place in the final with his partner, Candice Pascal.

On December 24, 2017, he joined the Swedish singer Zara Larsson with the hit single "Only You".

Discography

Albums with Star Académie 
 Star Académie 2012 (160,000 copies sold)
 Star Académie Noël 2012 (80,000 copies sold)

Solo albums 
 Olivier Dion (2014)
 Curious (2018)
 Exposed (2019)

Solo singles 
 "Si j'étais son soleil" (2014)
 "Curious (Depuis qu'on se connait)" (2018)

References 

1991 births
Living people
French Quebecers
French-language singers of Canada
Canadian pop singers
Canadian male musical theatre actors
Male actors from Quebec
Canadian expatriates in France
Musicians from Sherbrooke
Male bass guitarists
21st-century Canadian bass guitarists
Singers from Quebec
21st-century Canadian male singers